Halieutopsis simula, also known as fluffy-esca deepsea batfish, is a species of fish in the family Ogcocephalidae.

It is found in the Western Pacific Ocean.

References

Ogcocephalidae
Marine fish genera
Fish described in 1912
Taxa named by Hugh McCormick Smith
Taxa named by Lewis Radcliffe